The Casa de las Américas Prize (Premio Literario Casa de las Américas) is a literary award given by the Cuban Casa de las Américas. Established in 1959, it is one of Latin America’s oldest and most prestigious literary prizes.

The award is presented for works in Spanish, Portuguese, English, and French by writers from Latin America and the Caribbean. In addition to the main categories of fiction, poetry, and essays, there are categories for narrative and children's literature.

History
The award was founded in 1959 as the Hispanic American Literary Competition (Concurso Literario Hispanoamericano), as a Latin American counterpart to the British Booker Prize and the U.S. Pulitzer Prize. It was renamed as the Latin American Literary Competition (Concurso Literario Latinoamericano) in 1964, and has been presented under its current name since 1965.

Since 1960, the main categories are novels, poetry, short stories, drama, and essays in Spanish. In 1970, a new category was added for testimonial narratives, and in 1973, the awards in the essay and testimonio categories were expanded to include works in Portuguese by Brazilian authors. A category for children's literature was added in 1975, and works by Caribbean authors in English and French have been eligible in all genres of fiction since 1976 and 1978, respectively. Since 1978, works by Brazilian authors in Portuguese are eligible in all categories. In 2000, three honorary awards were established in the categories narrative, essay, and poetry.

Due to the growing diversity of genres and categories, awards in some categories are now presented in alternate years, and awards are not always presented in every category.

Winners

Juries for the awards are made up of prominent writers, academics, and intellectuals from throughout Latin America. 
     
Scholars and writers who have won the prize include Edward Brathwaite, Humberto Costantini, Eduardo Galeano, Renato Prada Oropeza, Susana Rotker, Rachel Beauvoir-Dominique, Françoise Perus, Beatriz González-Stephan, Anthony Phelps, Luis Britto García and Abel Sierra Madero. Among them are many recipients whose work was virtually unknown and who are now widely read and translated into many languages, such as Jorge Enrique Adoum and Roque Dalton.

The Casa de las Américas Prize has been credited with attracting international attention to Latin American literature, and with contributing to a major literary renaissance that resulted in the awarding of the Nobel Prize in Literature to writers such as Pablo Neruda in 1971 and Gabriel García Márquez in 1982.

Notes

References

External links
Premio Literario Casa de las Américas Official site

Awards established in 1959
1959 establishments in Cuba
Cuban literary awards